Allon Road is the name given by Israel to Routes 458, 508, and 578 in the West Bank, running roughly south–north along the eastern watershed of the Judaean and Samarian Hills, between Highway 1 near Kfar Adumim east of Jerusalem and Highway 90 at Mehola in the central Jordan Valley.

History
  

The road was the first step in implementing the Allon Plan, one of the earliest Israeli initiatives to deal with the territory west of Jordan that was occupied in the 1967 Six-Day War. The plan called for the Israeli annexation of the narrow corridor of land along the west of the Jordan River up to the eastern slopes of the Samarian mountains in order to assure minimal strategical depth while relinquishing the rest of the West Bank to Arab-Jordanian control.

The next step was to establish residential and agricultural settlements as well as military outposts along this strip of land in order to assure a minimal buffer zone that would hold up in the event of a Jordanian attack until Israeli Army reserve units could mobilize to the area. Between 1967 and 1977, the Israeli Labor Party governments created 21 settlements, mostly agricultural cooperatives in this area.

The effects of this plan can be easily seen from the fact that almost all the settlements on the Allon Road (E.g.: Alon, Rimonim, Gitit) are on the east side.

References

West Bank
Roads in Israeli-occupied territories